Pattazhy Vadakkekara  is a village in Kollam district in the state of Kerala, India. It is separated from Pattazhi by the Kallada River. Pattazhi Vadakkekkara is a part of Pathanapuram Block Panchayat and Kollam district Panchayat.

Demographics
 India census, Pattazhy Vadakkekara had a population of 14775 with 7020 males and 7755 females.

References

Villages in Kollam district